Count Your Blessings is a 1951 comedy play by the British writer Ronald Jeans. A married couple draw up a plan to solve their financial problems, but this soon runs into trouble.

It premiered at the Garrick Theatre, Southport before transferring to the West End where it ran for 92 performances between 7 March and 26 June 1951, initially at Wyndham's Theatre and then moving to the Westminster Theatre. The original London cast included Naunton Wayne, Patricia Dainton, Harold Lang, Eileen Way, Ambrosine Phillpotts, Joyce Redman and Viola Lyel.

References

Bibliography
 Wearing, J.P. The London Stage 1950-1959: A Calendar of Productions, Performers, and Personnel.  Rowman & Littlefield, 2014.

1951 plays
Plays by Ronald Jeans
West End plays
Comedy plays
Plays set in London